Kari Jo Gray (born September 20, 1960) is an American lawyer and judge who serves as an associate justice of the Wyoming Supreme Court since 2018.

Education 

Gray has a Bachelor of Science in finance from the University of Arkansas and a Juris Doctor from the University of Wyoming College of Law.

Legal career 

She served in private practice at Gray & Associates in Douglas, Wyoming for twelve years before becoming Chief of Staff to the governor in 2011.

Wyoming Supreme Court service 

Gray was one of three names submitted to the Governor by the judicial nominating commission for appointment to the Supreme Court. On September 4, 2018 Governor Matt Mead announced his selection of Gray to fill the seat left vacant by the retirement of E. James Burke. Gray's ascension to the state's highest court marked the third female appointment for the governor and the first time the court had a female majority in state history. She began her tenure on October 9, 2018.

References

External links 
Official Biography on Wyoming Supreme Court website

1960 births
Living people
20th-century American lawyers
21st-century American lawyers
21st-century American judges
People from Lusk, Wyoming
University of Arkansas alumni
University of Wyoming College of Law alumni
Wyoming lawyers
Justices of the Wyoming Supreme Court
21st-century American women judges
20th-century American women